Chaqa Gonuzh (also Romanized as Chaqā Gonūzh; also known as Choqā Konūzh) is a village in Sanjabi Rural District, Kuzaran District, Kermanshah County, Kermanshah Province, Iran. At the 2006 census, its population was 207, in 45 families.

References 

Populated places in Kermanshah County